is a former Japanese football player and manager.

Playing career
Katanosaka was born in Kagoshima on April 18, 1971. After graduating from high school, he joined Mazda (later Sanfrecce Hiroshima) in 1990. From 1991, he became a regular player as left side back. In 1994, the club won the 2nd place in J1 League. In 1995, however his opportunity to play decreased Ryuji Michiki and he moved to Kashiwa Reysol in July. He played as regular player and the club won the champions 1999 J.League Cup. However his opportunity to play decreased behind Tomonori Hirayama in late 1999. In 2000, he moved to Oita Trinita. However he could hardly play in the match and he moved to Gamba Osaka on loan in August. He played at Gamba until 2001 and he moved to Vegalta Sendai on loan in 2002. In 2003, he returned to Trinita and he retired end of 2003 season.

Coaching career
After retirement, Katanosaka started coaching career at Oita Trinita in 2004. In 2007, he moved to Gamba Osaka and became a coach. The club won the champions 2007 J.League Cup, 2008 and 2009 Emperor's Cup. In 2010, he moved to his first club Sanfrecce Hiroshima became a coach. The club won the champions 2012 and 2013 J1 League. In 2014, he moved to Gamba Osaka again. In 2014, the club won the champions all three major title in Japan J1 League, J.League Cup and Emperor's Cup. In 2015, the club won Emperor's Cup for 2 years in a row. In 2016, he moved to Oita Trinita and became a manager. In 2016, although Trinita played in J3 League, he led Trinita to won the champions and was promoted to J2 League. In 2018 season, Trinita won the 2nd place in J2 and was promoted to J1.

Club statistics

Managerial statistics
Update:14 August 2022''

Honours

Player
Kashiwa Reysol
 J.League Cup (1): 1999

Manager
Oita Trinita
 J3 League (1): 2016

Individual
 J.League Manager of the Year: 2019

References

External links
 
 
 Sanfrecce Hiroshima
 Profile at biglobe.ne.jp

1971 births
Living people
Association football people from Kagoshima Prefecture
Japanese footballers
Japan Soccer League players
J1 League players
J2 League players
Sanfrecce Hiroshima players
Kashiwa Reysol players
Oita Trinita players
Gamba Osaka players
Vegalta Sendai players
Japanese football managers
J1 League managers
J2 League managers
J3 League managers
Oita Trinita managers
Gamba Osaka managers
Association football defenders
People from Kagoshima